Filer City is an unincorporated community and census-designated place in Filer Charter Township, Manistee County, Michigan, United States. Its population was 116 as of the 2010 census. The community is located on Manistee Lake just south of Manistee. Filer City has a post office with ZIP code 49634. The post office opened March 10, 1868, was discontinued on April 12, 1871, and reopened on July 13, 1883.

Geography

Demographics

References

Unincorporated communities in Manistee County, Michigan
Unincorporated communities in Michigan
Census-designated places in Manistee County, Michigan
Census-designated places in Michigan